The 1985 VS of Denver was a women's tennis tournament played on indoor carpet courts in Denver, Colorado in the United States and part of the 1984 Virginia Slims World Championship Series. Sixth-seeded Peanut Louie-Harper won the singles title.

Finals

Singles
 Peanut Louie-Harper defeated  Zina Garrison 6–4, 4–6, 6–4

Doubles
 Mary Lou Daniels /  Robin White defeated  Leslie Allen /  Sharon Walsh 1–6, 6–4 7–5

Notes

References

External links
 ITF tournament edition details

Virginia Slims of Denver
Virginia Slims Of Denver, 1985
Virginia Slims of Denver
Virginia Slims of Denver
Virginia Slims of Denver